Yagutganj railway station is a single-platform stop in Yaqut Ganj village in the Farrukhabad district, Uttar Pradesh.  Nine trains stop there each day.

References

Railway stations in Farrukhabad district
Izzatnagar railway division